is a Japanese voice actress from Fukui Prefecture who is affiliated with Mausu Promotion. She made her voice acting debut in 2017, and in 2018 played her first main role as Hina Nitta in the anime television series Hinamatsuri.

Filmography

Anime

2017
Akiba's Trip: The Animation as Clerk, Reporter
Atom: The Beginning as Female university student (episode 6)
Aikatsu Stars! as Alice Carroll
18if as Eriko
Welcome to the Ballroom
Konohana Kitan as Child (episode 7)

2018
The Disastrous Life of Saiki K. as Female student
Pop Team Epic as Insta Girl B (episode 9)
Aikatsu Friends as Himari Hirata
Hinamatsuri as Hina Nitta
Crayon Shin-chan as Kindergartner F
Space Battleship Tiramisu as Child
Island as Emiri Sunada, Emily Snyder
Gundam Build Divers as Diver
Ms. Vampire who lives in my neighborhood as Friend A (episode 1)
The Girl in Twilight as Boy
Puzzle & Dragons as Child C
As Miss Beelzebub Likes as Female employee (episode 8)

2019
Hitori Bocchi no Marumaru Seikatsu as Futago Nosaki
Wasteful Days of High School Girls as Student (episode 5)
Granbelm as Infant
Aikatsu on Parade! as Alice Carroll

2020
Interspecies Reviewers as Roana
King's Raid: Successors of the Will as Ophelia
Dropout Idol Fruit Tart as Rua Nakamachi
Healin' Good Pretty Cure as Riri

2021
Muv-Luv Alternative as Miki Tamase
Deep Insanity: The Lost Child as EL-Cee

2022
Delicious Party Pretty Cure as Iroha Endo

Video games
2023
Da Capo 5 as Yuyu Matsuzaki

References

External links
Agency profile 

Actors from Fukui Prefecture
Living people
Japanese voice actresses
Mausu Promotion voice actors
1994 births